The 27th Ryder Cup Matches were held September 25–27, 1987 at Muirfield Village Golf Club in Dublin, Ohio, a suburb north of Columbus. The European team won their second consecutive competition by a score of 15 to 13 points in probably the most historic Ryder Cup. After an unbeaten record of 13–0 spanning sixty years, the U.S. team lost for the first time on home soil.

Europe took a lead of 5 points into the Sunday singles matches, but the U.S. fought back strongly to narrow the deficit. Eamonn Darcy, who previously had a very poor Ryder Cup record, defeated Ben Crenshaw at the last hole to get Europe to 13 points. Crenshaw had broken his putter in a moment of frustration after the sixth hole and putted with his 1 iron for the last dozen holes. Bernhard Langer then halved his match with Larry Nelson and when Seve Ballesteros defeated Curtis Strange 2 & 1 to total 14 points, the  European victory was secured.

This was the last Ryder Cup in which the U.S. team did not employ captain's selections.  Europe used captain's picks in 1979, 1981, 1985, and this year.

Muirfield Village, founded and designed by U.S. captain Jack Nicklaus, has hosted the Memorial Tournament on the PGA Tour since 1976. The 2013 Presidents Cup was held at the same course.

Format
The Ryder Cup is a match play event, with each match worth one point.  The competition format in 1987 adjusted slightly from the previous three events, with the order of play on the second day swapped:
Day 1 (Friday) — 4 foursome (alternate shot) matches in a morning session and 4 four-ball (better ball) matches in an afternoon session
Day 2 (Saturday) — 4 foursome matches in a morning session and 4 four-ball matches in an afternoon session
Day 3 (Sunday) — 12 singles matches
With a total of 28 points, 14 points were required to win the Cup.  All matches were played to a maximum of 18 holes.

Teams

Simpson qualified by virtue of winning the 1987 U.S. Open, while Nelson qualified by winning the 1987 PGA Championship.

The selection process for the European team remained unchanged from 1985, with nine players chosen from the 1987 European Tour money list at the conclusion of the German Open on August 30 and the remaining three team members being chosen immediately afterwards by the team captain, Tony Jacklin. Prior to the final event Eamonn Darcy was in the 9th qualifying place with Mats Lanner in 10th. Lanner finished just one shot ahead of Darcy in the German Open and Darcy retained his qualifying place. Jacklin's choices were Ken Brown, Sandy Lyle and José María Olazábal.

Captains picks are shown in yellow. The world rankings and records are at the start of the 1987 Ryder Cup.

Friday's matches

Morning foursomes

Afternoon four-ball

Saturday's matches

Morning foursomes

Afternoon four-ball

Sunday's singles matches

Individual player records
Each entry refers to the win–loss–half record of the player.

Source:

United States

Europe

References

Ryder Cup
Golf in Ohio
Sports in Dublin, Ohio
Ryder Cup
Ryder Cup
Ryder Cup
Ryder Cup